Spain competed at the 1971 European Athletics Championships in Helsinki, Finland, from 10–15 August 1971.

For the first time ever, Spain sent female athletes to the European Championships.

Results

Men
Track & road events

Field events

Combined events – Decathlon

Women
Track & road events

Nations at the 1971 European Athletics Championships
1971
European Athletics Championships